VA-55 may refer to:

VA-55 (U.S. Navy)
Virginia State Route 55